Waikumete may refer to:
Glen Eden, New Zealand, known by the name Waikumete until 1921
The Waikumete Cemetery, located in Glen Eden
Little Muddy Creek (New Zealand), traditionally known as Waikūmete